This is a list of the 224 resident embassies in Rome (138 for Italy and 86 for the Holy See). For other diplomatic missions in Italy and the Vatican City, see List of diplomatic missions in Italy and the List of diplomatic missions to the Holy See.

Embassies to Italy

Embassies to the Holy See

See also 
 Foreign relations of Italy
 Foreign relations of the Vatican City
 List of diplomatic missions in Italy
 List of diplomatic missions to the Holy See

References 

 
 
Italy
Diplomatic missions
diplomatic missions